Leslie Wright may refer to:
 Leslie Wright (cricketer) (1903–1956), English cricketer
 Leslie Wright (priest) (1899–1972), Anglican priest
 Leslie Stephen Wright (1913–1997), American educator
 Leslie Wright (pianist) (born 1938), Ecuadorian pianist